The Blue Angels is the U.S. Navy flight demonstration team.

Blue Angels may also refer to:
 Blue Angels Motorcycle Club, the Scottish outlaw motorcycle club
 Blue Angels Peak, a peak located in the Sierra Juárez mountains
 "Blue Angels" (song), a 1998 song by Pras Michel
 Hamburg Blue Angels, a cheerleading squad for the Hamburg Blue Devils American football team
 Mighty Blue Angels FC, a Liberian football club
Blue Angels: Formation Flight Simulation, a 1989 flight simulator video game

See also
 Blue Angel (disambiguation)